Lauzerville is a commune in the Haute-Garonne department in southwestern France. As of 2019, there are 590 dwellings in Lauzerville.

Population
An outer suburb of Toulouse, its population has been growing rapidly since the 1980s.

See also
Communes of the Haute-Garonne department

References

Communes of Haute-Garonne